Life Is Just a Bowl of Cherries is an album by trumpeter Howard McGhee featuring songs from the musical film The Best Things in Life Are Free which were recorded in 1956 and released on the Bethlehem label.

Reception

Allmusic awarded the album 3 stars.

Track listing 
All compositions by Ray Henderson, Buddy DeSylva and Lew Brown except as indicated
 "Sonny Boy" - 3:54 	
 "So Blue" - 2:30 	
 "(Here I Am) Broken Hearted" 3:04 	
 "The Thrill Is Gone" (Henderson, Brown) - 3:15 	
 "Just Imagine" - 3:17 	
 "(I'm a Dreamer) Aren't We All" - 3:03 	
 "My Song" (Henderson, Brown) - 3:10 	
 "The Best Things in Life Are Free" - 2:53 	
 "Life Is Just a Bowl of Cherries" (Henderson, Brown) - 2:54 	
 "Together" - 2:10 	
 "Come To Me" - 3:14	
 "My Sin" - 3:12

Personnel 
Howard McGhee - trumpet
Danny Bank, Phil Bonder, Sid Brown, Leon Cohen, Herbie Mann - saxophone
Donn Trenner - piano
Al Caiola - guitar
Arnold Fishkind - bass
Osie Johnson, Don Lamond - drums
String section arranged and conducted by Frank Hunter

References 

 

Howard McGhee albums
1956 albums
Bethlehem Records albums